Robert Carson (October 6, 1909, Clayton, Washington – January 19, 1983, Los Angeles, California) was an American film and television screenwriter, novelist, and short story writer, who won an Academy Award in 1938 for his screenplay of A Star Is Born. He was married to Mary Jane Irving, a former child actress.

Film screenwriting credits
A Star Is Born (1937). Academy Award for best writing, original story, shared with William A. Wellman. Nominated for best writing, screenplay, shared with Alan Campbell and Dorothy Parker.
The Last Gangster (1937)
Men with Wings (1938)
Beau Geste (1939)
The Light That Failed (1939)
Western Union (1941)
The Desperadoes (1943)
Once More, My Darling (1949)
Just for You (1952)
Bundle of Joy (1956)

Television screenwriting credits
Westinghouse Studio One, 1948 (various episodes)

Bibliography
The Revels Are Ended (1936). Doubleday.
"Aloha Means Goodbye", a serialized short novel about a Japanese attack on Pearl Harbor, published in The Saturday Evening Post in June/July 1941, six months before the actual attack occurred. The story was the basis for the film Across the Pacific (1942).
Stranger in Our Midst (1947). G.P. Putnam. Reprinted 1953, Popular Library.<ref>[https://books.google.com/books?id=c8SlGAAACAAJ&dq=inauthor:%22Robert+Carson%22 "Stranger in Our Midst at Google Books]</ref>The Magic Lantern (1952), a fictionalized account of Hollywood. Henry HoltThe Quality of Mercy (1954). Henry Holt.Love Affair (1958). Henry Holt. reprinted 1959, Popular Library.My Hero (1961) McGraw Hill. Reprinted 1962, Crest BooksAn End to Comedy (1963) Bobbs-MerrillThe Outsiders (1966), Little, Brown. Reprinted 1970, CoronetJellybean'' (1974), a civil war period western. Little, Brown

References

External links

Carson at Variety

1909 births
1983 deaths
American male screenwriters
Best Story Academy Award winners
American male short story writers
20th-century American short story writers
20th-century American male writers
20th-century American screenwriters